Regius Professor of Anatomy is the title of a chair held at a two universities in Scotland.

 Regius Professor of Anatomy (Aberdeen), for the University of Aberdeen
 Regius Professor of Anatomy (Glasgow), for the University of Glasgow

See also
 Regius Professor, for similar professorships